Events from the year 1955 in Sweden

Incumbents
 Monarch – Gustaf VI Adolf 
 Prime Minister – Tage Erlander

Events

Births

 

 5 January – Jacob Hård, journalist
22 March – Lena Olin, actress.
29 March – Rolf Lassgård, actor.
 26 April – Ulrika Knape, diver, Olympic champion from 1972.
 4 July – Leif Högström, fencer.

Exact date unknown
 Ann Jäderlund, poet.

Deaths
 5 March – Paul Isberg, sailor (born 1887).
 18 April – John Jarlén, gymnast (born 1880).
 27 September – Nils Adlercreutz, horse rider (born 1866).

References

 
Years of the 20th century in Sweden